Beatrix of Baden (22 January 1492 – 4 April 1535) was a margravine (wife of a margrave) of Baden by birth and by marriage and a Countess Palatine of Simmern.  She was a daughter of Christoph I, Margrave of Baden and Ottilie of Katzenelnbogen.

Marriage and issue 
In 1508 she married the Count Palatine  Johann II of Simmern (born: 21 March 1492; died: 18 May 1557).  With him she had twelve children:
 Catherine (1510–1572), Abbess in Kumbd monastery
 Johanna (1512–1581), Abbess in Marienberg monastery at Boppard
 Ottilia (1513–1553), nun at Marienberg in Boppard
 Frederick III the Pious (1515–1576), Elector Palatine
 married firstly 1537 Princess Marie of Brandenburg-Kulmbach (1519–1567)
 married secondly 1569 Countess Amalia of Neuenahr-Alpen (1540–1602)
 Brigitta (1516–1562), Abbess at Neuburg an der Donau
 Georg (1518–1569), Count Palatine of Simmern-Sponheim
 married in 1541 princess Elisabeth of Hesse (1503–1563)
 Elisabeth (1520–1564)
 married in 1535 Count Georg II of Lauterbach (1506-1569)
 Reichard (1521–1598), Count Palatine of Simmern-Sponheim
 married in firstly 1569 Countess Juliane of Wied (1545-1575)
 married in secondly 1578 Countess Emilie of Württemberg (1550-1589)
 married in thirdly 1589 Countess Palatine Anna Margarete of Veldenz (1571-1621)
 Maria (1524–1576), nun at Marienberg in Boppard
 William (1526–1527)
 Sabine (1528–1578)
 married in 1544 Count Lamoral of Egmont (1522–1568)
 Helena (1532–1579)
 married in 1551 Count Philipp III of Hanau-Münzenberg (1526–1561)

Ancestors

References

House of Wittelsbach
Margravines of Baden
Countesses Palatine of the Holy Roman Empire
1492 births
1535 deaths
16th-century German people
Princesses of the Palatinate
16th-century German women
15th-century German people
15th-century German women
Daughters of monarchs